was a town located in Kaifu District, Tokushima Prefecture, Japan.

As of 2003, the town had an estimated population of 5,563 and a density of 47.27 persons per km2. The total area was 117.69 km2.

On March 31, 2006, Hiwasa, along with the town of Yuki (also from Kaifu District), was merged to create the town of Minami.

External links

 Minami official website (in Japanese)

Dissolved municipalities of Tokushima Prefecture
Minami, Tokushima